Katherine Kirk (born 26 February 1982) is a professional golfer from Australia, currently playing on the U.S.-based LPGA Tour and the ALPG Tour. She played under her maiden name, Katherine Hull, until her marriage to Tom Kirk on 2 August 2012 and also under the name Katherine Hull-Kirk.

Amateur career
Hull began playing golf at age 12 in her native Australia. She attended Pepperdine University in Malibu, California, where she was an All-American in 2002–03 and was the NCAA Player of the Year in 2003. She collected eight collegiate wins during her career. Hull graduated from college in 2003 with a degree in Sports Administration.

Professional career
After graduating from college in 2003, Hull turned professional, playing on the Duramed Futures Tour. She won her first two events as a professional, the Aurora Health Care FUTURES Charity Golf Classic, and the Lima Memorial Hospital Foundation FUTURES Classic the next week. She finished tied for 42nd at the final LPGA Qualifying Tournament in 2003 to earn non-exempt status on the LPGA Tour for 2004. In 2006, Hull won two events on the Australian Ladies Professional Golf Tour (ALPG), and also earned full playing privileges on the LGPA Tour for 2007 after returning to the LPGA Qualifying Tour

Hull's breakout year as a professional was 2008. She earned her first win on the LPGA Tour at the Canadian Women's Open and went on to record eight top-10 finishes during the season, including seven top 10s in her last ten events played. She finished 13th on the official LPGA money list.

She opened the 2009 season with a win in the ANZ Ladies Masters, a tournament co-sanctioned by the ALPG and the Ladies European Tour and finished on top of the Order of Merit for 2008/09 on the ALPG.

Professional wins (11)

LPGA Tour (3)

ALPG Tour (6)

* Co-sanctioned with Ladies European Tour

Futures Tour (2)

Source:

Results in LPGA majors
Results not in chronological order before 2019.

^ The Evian Championship was added as a major in 2013

CUT = missed the half-way cut
NT = no tournament
T = tied

Summary

Most consecutive cuts made – 7 (2009 British Open – 2011 LPGA)
Longest streak of top-10s – 1 (five times)

LPGA Tour career summary

 official through 2022 season

Futures Tour summary

joined in late May at mid-season

Team appearances
Amateur
Espirito Santo Trophy (representing Australia): 2002 (winners)

Professional
Lexus Cup (representing International team): 2008 (winners)
International Crown (representing Australia): 2014, 2018
The Queens (representing Australia): 2015, 2016, 2017

References

External links

Australian female golfers
Pepperdine Waves women's golfers
ALPG Tour golfers
LPGA Tour golfers
Golfers from Brisbane
Sportswomen from Queensland
Golfers from Wichita, Kansas
1982 births
Living people